Aabroo (Hindi: आबरू, transl. reputation) is a Bollywood film. It was released in 1943. The film was directed by Nazir and starred Sitara Devi, Yakub, Masud, Nazir Ahmed, Laddan and Chandabai. The music was composed by Pandit Gobindram.

Nazir had starred with Sitara Devi earlier in Baagbaan (1938) and when he re-launched his banner 'Hind Pictures' in 1943, he offered a partnership to Sitara Devi. She acted in all the five films produced by Hind Pictures that year. Four of them including Aabroo co-starred Nazir while one (Salma) had Ishwarlal opposite her.

Cast
Sitara as Shobha and Malti
Yaqoob as Hari
Jagdish as Dharam Dass
Nazir as Jeevan
Masood as Kunwar
Shakir as Pujari
Chanda Bai as Lachhi's mother
Vatsala Kumthekar as Lachhi
Janardan Sharma as Manager 
Laddan

Soundtrack
The music director was Pandit Gobindram and the lyrics were written by several lyricists, namely: Tanveer Naqvi, Rajjan, Hasrat Lakhnavi, Swami Ramanand Saraswati. One version of the old popular song "Inhi Logon Ne Le Leena Dupatta Mera" is rendered in the film  by Yakub. The lyrics are credited to Tanvir Naqvi, though there is a song recorded earlier than this. The song later gained popularity when used in Pakeezah 1972, sung by Lata Mangeshkar and with lyrics credited to Majrooh Sultanpuri.

Discography

References

External links
 
 Aabroo on YouTube

1943 films
1940s Hindi-language films
Indian black-and-white films